Phaeostachys is a genus of bryozoans belonging to the family Escharinidae.

The species of this genus are found in North Europe.

Species:

Phaeostachys schmitzi 
Phaeostachys spinifera

References

Bryozoan genera